Girls in Chains is a 1943 American women in prison film directed by Edgar G. Ulmer and starring Arline Judge.

Plot

Johnny Moon is a mob boss who controls everything from politicians to a profitable women's penitentiary he runs. He has ruined many lives, including that of Helen Martin, a teacher, and her sister Jean.

A political reformer, Frank Donovan, is able to persuade Helen to go undercover behind bars, posing as an inmate, to unearth evidence that will prove Moon's abuse of the incarcerated women. She ultimately succeeds, but not before placing her life in grave danger.

Cast
Arline Judge as Helen Martin
Roger Clark as Frank Donovan
Robin Raymond as Rita Randall
Barbara Pepper as Ruth
Dorothy Burgess as Mrs. Peters
Clancy Cooper as Marcus
Addison Randall as Johnny Moon
Patricia Knox as Jean Moon
Sid Melton as Pinkhead
Russell Gaige as Dalvers
Emmett Lynn as Lionel Cleeter
Richard Clarke as Tom Havershield
Betty Blythe as Mrs. Grey

External links

 
 
 
 

1943 films
American crime drama films
American black-and-white films
Films directed by Edgar G. Ulmer
1943 crime drama films
1940s English-language films
1940s American films